Debbie Turner (born Debra Turner in Arcadia, CA, USA) is an American actress who played the role of Marta von Trapp in the film The Sound of Music.

Life and career
Turner was raised in Arcadia, California. In 1964 she won the role of Marta Von Trapp in The Sound of Music. Shortly after the film's debut, she left the film industry and returned to school to complete her education.

She also appeared as a party guest in the 1979 film North Dallas Forty.

In 1985, Turner relocated to Chanhassen, Minnesota, where she raised four daughters with her husband Rick. Though not currently active in the film industry, she regularly visits with her The Sound of Music family and has made a number of television appearances, including The Oprah Winfrey Show where she discussed the 45th anniversary of The Sound of Music. In addition, Turner was selected as one of three float judges for the 2011 Tournament of Roses Parade.

References

External links
 
 Debbie Turner Originals

Living people
20th-century American actresses
American film actresses
Actresses from California
American child actresses
People from Arcadia, California
American people of Canadian descent
21st-century American women
Year of birth missing (living people)